Andrei Vasilyevich Smirnov (born 19 September 1962) is a former Russian football player.

References

1962 births
Living people
Soviet footballers
FC SKA-Khabarovsk players
FC Okean Nakhodka players
Russian footballers
Russian Premier League players
FC Luch Vladivostok players
Place of birth missing (living people)
Association football midfielders
FC Smena Komsomolsk-na-Amure players